The Capital Press is a weekly agricultural newspaper covering the West Coast of the United States, and published in Salem, Oregon. The newspaper covers farming, ranching and agriculture industries in the Pacific Northwest. The newspaper is owned by the EO Media Group.

The paper was established in February 1928 as the Hollywood Press by Abner M. Church as a community newspaper serving a portion of Oregon's capital city. The name of the newspaper was changed in December 1932 to Capital Press.

Bill Duncan published a column from 1981 until his death in 2011; the News Review of Roseburg, Oregon deems it "still pertinent" and is republishing it as of 2018.

References

External links
The Capital Press (official website)
History of The Capital Press from EO Media Group
Capital Press History from Salem Online History

1928 establishments in Oregon
Mass media in Salem, Oregon
Newspapers published in Oregon
Oregon Newspaper Publishers Association
Publications established in 1928